"Vitamin C" is a song by the krautrock band Can on their 1972 album Ege Bamyası. Considering its short length and relatively standard song structure, it is one of the band's more conventional songs.

It was featured in Samuel Fuller's German television Tatort production Tote Taube in der Beethovenstraße (Dead Pigeon on Beethoven Street) in 1973, and then also released as a single with the B-side "I'm So Green".

In 1997, an 8-minute version of the song, remixed by British musical outfit U.N.K.L.E., was featured on Can's double remix album Sacrilege.

Vitamin C was featured in the opening of Paul Thomas Anderson's 2014 film Inherent Vice.

An interpolation of a keyboard sample from the song was used in Brooklyn band Woods' 2016 song "Can't See at All".

In 2016, The theme song of Jaden Smith's character 'Dizzee' throughout the Netflix series The Get Down features the famous songtext "Hey you! You're losing, you're losing..." but instead of "vitamin C" the lyrics were altered to "your mind".

In 2018 the DJs Adam Beyer & Bart Skils released their track "Your mind" which features the sample from The Get Down theme song.

In JoJolion, the eighth part of the long-running Manga series JoJo's Bizarre Adventure, Damo Tamaki's stand, "Vitamin C", is named after the song. The character of Damo Tamaki is also a reference to Damo Suzuki.

References

Featured in the film "Broken Embraces" (2009) by Pedro Almodovar

Featured in Episode One of Netflix series The Get Down (2016)
Jojolion Character's Stand Name is "Vitamin C"

Featured in Season 2 Episode 4 of HBO Max's Euphoria (2019) in the scene where Rue, Elliot, and Jules are driving in the car

Vitamin C(song) was used in Celine Summer 2022 fashion collection show https://www.youtube.com/watch?v=Aa8Lz91sCl4

1972 songs
Funk songs
Can (band) songs
United Artists Records singles